Tamara Mikhailovna Gverdtsiteli (born 18 January 1962) is a Georgian-Russian singer and actress.

Early life and education 
Gverdtsiteli was born on 18 January 1962 in Tbilisi, in the Georgian Soviet Socialist Republic. Her father came from a Georgian aristocratic family, and her mother was Inna Kofman, a Jewish woman and granddaughter of a rabbi from Odessa.

Gverdtsiteli graduated from the music school at the piano department of the Tbilisi State Conservatoire. In the early 1970s, she became a soloist of a children's music group called Mziuri, with which she toured the countries of Soviet Union. The singer sang in this formation for the next seven years.

Career 
At the age of 19, Gverdtsiteli finished in second place at the All-Union Festival in Dnepropetrovsk and won the international competition "Red Carnation" in Sochi. The songs "Music" (V. Azarashvili, M. Potskhishvili) and "Blossom, my land" brought her to fame. In 1982, she took part in a popular music competition in Dresden, in 1988 she won the Golden Orpheus song contest, then performed as a guest artist at the festivals in Sopot and Sanremo. Since 1987, Gverdtsiteli has acted as a jury member of music festivals. 

In 1991, Gverdtsiteli was invited by her French agent to Paris, where she met Michel Legrand and Jean Dréjac. At the same time, a contract was signed with Legrand and her first concert took place at the Olympia. Legrand, introducing the three-thousandth hall, said: "Paris! Remember this name." In Gverdtsiteli's repertoire, songs of civil sound coexisted with elegiac, lyrical songs. Gradually, more and more songs of her own composition appeared. Of the major events of her creative life, her solo concerts include at Olympia (Paris, 1994), with the A. Kozlov Ensemble at Carnegie Hall (New York, 1995), Michel Legrand Presents Tamara Gverdtsiteli (New York, 1996). 

From 2007 to 2008, Gverdtsiteli was a member of the Supreme Council of the Civilian Power party. In 2010, she performed the part of Carmen on the stage of the Dnepropetrovsk Opera House with the Milanese baritone Giovanni Ribichesu.

In 2014, Gverdtsiteli became a judge in The Voice of Ukraine, the Ukrainian version of The Voice. She was also a judge in The Voice Senior in 2020.

Personal life 
Gverdtsiteli has been married three times. Her first husband was Giorgi Kakhabrishvili, director and vice-chairman of the Georgian Public Broadcasting. The couple got married in 1984, and in 1986, their only son, Alexander, was born. In 1995, the couple divorced after eleven years of marriage. Gverdtsiteli's second husband was a lawyer named Dmitry Breslav, with whom she moved to Boston. A few months later, however, Breslav died of heart failure. Her third husband was cardiac surgeon Sergei Ambatelo. The couple divorced in December 2005.

On 12 July 2000, Gverdtsiteli received Russian citizenship.

Discography 
 1982 – Debyut. Tamara Gverdtsiteli (min'on)
 1985 – Muzyka: poyot Tamara Gverdtsiteli
 1992 — Tamara Gverdtsiteli poyot svoi pesni
 1994 — Vivat, Korol'!
 1996 — Spasibo, Muzyka, tebe!
 2000 — Luchshiye pesni raznykh let
 2001 — Posvyashcheniye Zhenshchine
 2002 — Vivat, Lyubov', Vivat!
 2002 — Mne vchera prisnilos' nebo
 2003 — Izbrannoye
 2004 — Muzyka — Khram Dushi
 2008 — Vozdushnyy potseluy
 2008 — MP3-al'bom  Izbrannoye
 2009 — The Best (2 CD)
 2016 — Tamara Gverdtsiteli
 2017 — Momele

References

External links

1962 births
Living people
Musicians from Tbilisi
Russian film actresses
Russian people of Georgian descent
Russian people of Jewish descent
Russian stage actresses
Soviet film actresses
Soviet stage actresses
Soviet women singers
People's Artists of Georgia
People's Artists of Russia
Tbilisi State Conservatoire alumni
20th-century Russian women singers
20th-century Russian singers
Russian National Music Award winners
21st-century women singers from Georgia (country)
Soviet child singers
20th-century women singers from Georgia (country)
Russian activists against the 2022 Russian invasion of Ukraine